Irina Grigorieva may refer to:
 Irina Grigorieva (academic), physics professor
 Irina Grigorieva (footballer)